Al Shumaysani  is a neighborhood in the Al-Abdali district of the Amman Governorate in north-western Jordan.

References

Neighbourhoods of Amman